Maria Ernestina Carneiro Santiago de Souza (pseudonym, Miêtta Santiago; Varginha, 1903–1995) was a Brazilian writer, poet, lawyer, suffragist and feminist activist in support of women's rights. She was one of the early women in Brazil to fully exercise their political rights.

Biography
With Celina Guimarães Viana, Santiago was a pioneer in 1927 in the struggle for women's suffrage in Brazil. In 1928, Santiago challenged the constitutionality of the ban on women voting in Brazil, stating that it breached Article 70 of the Constitution of the Federal Republic of the United States of Brazil, dated February 24, 1891, which was then in force.

Selected works 
 Namorada da Deus (1936)
 Maria Ausência (1940)
 Uma consciência unitária para a humanidade (1981)
 As 7 poesias (1981)

References

1903 births
1995 deaths
People from Minas Gerais
Brazilian women poets
20th-century Brazilian lawyers
Brazilian suffragists
Brazilian feminists
Brazilian women's rights activists
20th-century Brazilian poets
20th-century Brazilian women writers
Brazilian women lawyers
20th-century women lawyers